Charles Henderson (born December 18, 1946) is a former American football coach.  He served as the head football coach from 1979 to 1980 at Delaware State College—now known as Delaware State University—a historically black college in Dover, Delaware. He compiled a 6–14–1 record in two seasons as head coach after several seasons as an assistant under head coach Ed Wyche. Henderson was embroiled in a lawsuit against Delaware State that advanced to United States District Court when he was involved in an extramarital affair with a female employee who was fired when she became pregnant for violating unwritten moral clauses. The female employee won the lawsuit and was reinstated.

Head coaching record

References

1946 births
Living people
Delaware State Hornets football coaches